Al-Kūrah is one of the districts  of Irbid governorate, Jordan.

References 

 

Districts of Jordan